Amornrat Kaewbaidhoon (born 23 June 1944) is a Thai archer.

Career 

She competed at the 1976 Summer Olympic Games in the women's individual event and finished eighteenth with a score of 2282 points.

Kaewbaidhoon won eight medals at the Southeast Asian Games from 1977 to 1981.

References

External links 

 Profile on worldarchery.org

1944 births
Living people
Amornrat Kaewbaidhoon
Amornrat Kaewbaidhoon
Archers at the 1976 Summer Olympics
Competitors at the 1977 Southeast Asian Games
Competitors at the 1979 Southeast Asian Games
Competitors at the 1981 Southeast Asian Games
Southeast Asian Games medalists in archery
Amornrat Kaewbaidhoon
Amornrat Kaewbaidhoon
Amornrat Kaewbaidhoon
Amornrat Kaewbaidhoon